Sir John Jenkins  (born 26 January 1955) is a British former diplomat who was ambassador to several countries.

Career
John Jenkins was educated at St Philip's Grammar School, Birmingham, The Becket School, Nottinghamshire and Jesus College, Cambridge where he gained a BA and a doctorate (PhD) in 1980. He joined the Foreign and Commonwealth Office (FCO) in 1980 and served in Abu Dhabi, Kuala Lumpur and Kuwait before being appointed ambassador to Burma 1999–2002; Consul-General at Jerusalem 2003–06; ambassador to Syria 2006–07; Director, Middle East and North Africa at the FCO 2007–09; ambassador to Iraq 2009–11; UK Special Representative to the National Transitional Council of Libya May–October 2011, then briefly ambassador to Libya October–November 2011; and ambassador to Saudi Arabia from June 2012.

At the end of January 2015 he retired from the Diplomatic Service and as of 27 January 2015 became Executive Director of the Middle East branch of the International Institute for Strategic Studies, based in Bahrain.

Jenkins was appointed LVO in 1989, CMG in the New Year Honours of 2003 and knighted KCMG in the Queen's Birthday Honours of 2011. He is a Serving Brother of the Order of St John of Jerusalem.

References

Sources
JENKINS, Sir John, Who's Who 2013, A & C Black, 2013; online edn, Oxford University Press, Dec 2012
Sir John Jenkins, gov.uk

1955 births
Living people
Alumni of Jesus College, Cambridge
Ambassadors of the United Kingdom to Myanmar
Consuls-General of the United Kingdom to Jerusalem
Ambassadors of the United Kingdom to Syria
Ambassadors of the United Kingdom to Iraq
Ambassadors of the United Kingdom to Libya
Ambassadors of the United Kingdom to Saudi Arabia
Knights Commander of the Order of St Michael and St George
Lieutenants of the Royal Victorian Order
People educated at St Philip's School
Serving Brothers of the Order of St John